Cyrus Freeman Hayden (September 1839 – possibly February 25, 1912) was a United States Navy sailor received the Medal of Honor for his actions during the Korean Expedition on June 11, 1871.  While serving as the color bearer for the 's crew and Marines, Hayden planted the American Flag on the ramparts under heavy enemy fire.

Hayden enlisted in the Navy from Boston, Massachusetts in 1869. While some list Hayden's death as occurring in 1912, there is no evidence "that the man buried in Maine was a veteran."

Medal of Honor citation
Rank and organization: Carpenter, U.S. Navy. Born: 1843, York, Maine Accredited to: Maine. G.O. No.: 169, February 8, 1872. 

Citation:

On board the USS Colorado during the attack and capture of the Korean forts, 11 June 1871. Serving as color bearer of the battalion, Hayden planted his flag on the ramparts of the citadel and protected it under a heavy fire from the enemy.

See also
List of Medal of Honor recipients
General Orders and Circulars Issued by the Navy Department

References

1839 births
1912 deaths
United States Navy sailors
People from York, Maine
United States Navy Medal of Honor recipients
Korean Expedition (1871) recipients of the Medal of Honor